BB Gabor is a 1980 album by the Hungarian Canadian artist B. B. Gabor. It featured two Canadian hit singles: "Nyet Nyet Soviet (Soviet Jewellery)" and "Metropolitan Life." The album focused on themes such as city life, Soviet oppression, love, and consumerism.

In 2007, 17 years after Gabor's death, the Canadian label Pacemaker Entertainment combined his two albums, BB Gabor and Girls of the Future, onto a single CD.

Track listing

Personnel
 B. B. Gabor: Guitars, vocals
 David Bendeth: Guitars
 David Stone: Synthesizers, synthesized bass, clavinet
 Jim Jones: Acoustic & electric bass
 Mike Sloski: Drums
 Paul Armstrong: Drums, percussion
 Peter Follett: Guitar
 Polly T. & The Buros: Vocal backing
 Rob Gusevs: Piano, organ
 Simon Stone: Flute
 Terry Brown: Tambourine
 Tom Griffiths: Bass
 Denis Keldi: Writer
 Leon Stevenson: Writer
 "Cosmic" Ray Scott: Writer

References

1980 albums
B. B. Gabor albums
Anthem Records albums
Albums produced by Terry Brown (record producer)
Pop albums by Hungarian artists